Rebelde (English: Rebel) is a Mexican telenovela produced by Pedro Damián for Televisa, broadcast by Canal de las Estrellas (now known simply as Las Estrellas). It is a remake of the Argentine telenovela, Rebelde Way, adapted for the Mexican youth audience, leading to differences in characters' backgrounds. Rebelde originally aired from Monday, 4 October 2004, to Friday, 2 June 2006. It was replaced with Código Postal.

Rebelde is set in the Elite Way School, a prestigious private boarding school on the outskirts of Mexico City, with a major plot line revolving around six adolescent students – Mía Colucci Cáceres (Anahí), Roberta Pardo Rey (Dulce María), Miguel Arango Cervera (Alfonso Herrera), Diego Bustamante (Christopher von Uckermann), Guadalupe "Lupita" Fernández (Maite Perroni) and Giovanni Méndez López (Christian Chávez) – forming a band. Additional subplots involve the school's faculty and the students' parents. One trademark of the telenovela is the random use of English words and phrases, often used by fresa characters.

Another notable aspect is that the actors playing the band members are themselves in an actual group named RBD and perform most of the music used on the telenovela, including the opening theme song, "Rebelde". The group achieved international success from 2004 until their separation in 2009 and sold over 15 million records worldwide, making them one of the best-selling Latin music acts of all time.

Univision aired Rebelde weekdays afternoon at 3pm/2c from 21 March 2005, to 15 December 2006, replacing Corazones al límite. The last episode was broadcast on Friday, 15 December 2006, with Las dos caras de Ana replacing it on Monday, 18 December 2006.

In 2021, Netflix announced a reboot of the show, set for release the following year. The series, also titled Rebelde, was released on January 5, 2022, and is set 16 years after the end of the soap opera.

Plot 
The Elite Way School is a private boarding school with international prestige where high-class students receive a high level of education to be prepared for a great future. The school has a scholarship program for people with low financial resources who have an excellent academic level. However, few even graduate since they are persecuted by a secret society called "La Logia" ("The Lodge"), whose purpose is to conserve the purity of the privileged class. Among the students are Mía (Anahí), Roberta (Dulce María), Miguel (Alfonso Herrera), Diego (Christopher von Uckermann), Lupita (Maite Perroni) and Giovanni (Christian Chávez). Six adolescents who, despite their differences, discover something that will unite them above all – their love for music.

Cast

Starring 

 Enrique Rocha as León Bustamante
 Juan Ferrara as Franco Colucci
 Ninel Conde as Alma Rey
 Patricio Borghetti as Enrique Madarriaga (seasons 1, 3)
 Leticia Perdigón as Mayra Fernández
 Anahí as Mía Colucci Cáceres
 Dulce María as Roberta Alejandra Pardo Rey
 Alfonso Herrera as Miguel Arango Cervera
 Christopher von Uckermann as Diego Bustamante
 Estefanía Villarreal as Celina Ferrer
 Karla Cossío as Pilar Gandía
 Zoraida Gómez as Jóse Luján Landeros
 Jack Duarte as Tomás Goycolea
 Maite Perroni as Guadalupe "Lupita" Fernández
 Eddy Vilard as Teódoro "Téo" Ruiz Palacios
 Angelique Boyer as Victoria "Vico" Paz
 Rodrigo Nehme as Nicolás "Nico" Huber
 Christian Chávez as Giovanni Méndez López
 Michel Gurfi as Joaquín Mascaró (season 1)
 Grettell Valdez as Renata Lizaldi (season 1)
 Miguel Rodarte as Carlo Colucci (season 1)
 Tony Dalton as Gastón Diestro
 Héctor Gómez as Hilario Ortiz Tirado (season 1)
 Nailea Norvind as Marina Casares de Colucci (seasons 2–3)
 Derrick James as Santos Echagüe Robles / Santos Echague (seasons 2–3)
 Diego Boneta as Rocco Bezauri (seasons 2–3)
 María Fernanda Malo as Sol De La Riva (seasons 2–3)
 Antonio Sáenz as Iñaki (seasons 2–3)
 Allisson Lozano as Bianca Delight (seasons 2–3)
 Viviana Ramos as Dolores "Lola" Arregui (seasons 2–3)
 Ronald Duarte as Jack
 Rafael Inclán as Guillermo Arregui (season 2)
 Patsy as Inés (season 3)

Also starring 

 Felipe Nájera as Pascual Gandía
 Pedro Weber "Chatanuga" as Pedro / Peter
 María Fernanda García as Alicia Salazar
 Manola Diez as Pepa
 Xochitl Vigil as Rosa Fernández
 Gabriela Bermúdez as Elena Cervera de Arango
 Alejandra Peniche as Damiana Mitre de Ferrer
 Lourdes Canale as Hilda Acosta / Profesora Hilda Bernard
 Dobrina Cristeva as Yolanda "Yoli" Huber
 Abraham Stavans as Joel Huber
 Jorge Zamora as Maurice
 Aitor Iturrioz as Esteban Nolasco
 Tiaré Scanda as Galia Dunoff de Gandía
 Roberto "Puck" Miranda as Cosme Méndez
 Patricia Martínez as Luisa López de Méndez
 Cynthia Coppelli as Mabel Bustamante
 Salvador Julián as Carlos Velásquez
 Liuba De Lasse as Catalina "Cata"
 Yessica Salazar as Valeria Olivier (seasons 2–3)
 Gerardo Klein as Fernando Ferrer (seasons 2–3)
 Lisardo as Martín Reverte / Octavio Reverte (seasons 2–3)
 Lourdes Reyes as Julia Lozano (seasons 2–3)
 Claudia Schmidt as Sabrina Guzmán (seasons 2–3)
 Alfonso Iturralde as Héctor Paz (seasons 2–3)
 Roxana Martínez as Milagrosa (season 3)
 Miguel Ángel Biaggio as Javier Alanis (season 3)

Recurring 
 Eleazar Gómez as Leonardo Francisco Blanco (season 2)
 Florencia del Saracho as Romina (season 2)

Special guest stars 
 Hilary Duff as herself
 La Quinta Estación as themselves
 Lenny Kravitz as himself
 Ricardo Montaner as himself
 Tiziano Ferro as himself
 José Ron as Enzo

Awards and nominations

Elite Way School uniforms

Casual
Both girls and boys wear red sport jackets with matching ties, and long-sleeved white dress-shirts. Boys wear blue jeans and black dress-shoes with their jackets and shirts, while girls wear blue denim miniskirts and black knee-boots. Moreover, girls often untuck and tie up their white dress-shirts, exposing their midriff. Girls also wear regulation underwear: full-cut black briefs with matching sport-bras, as demonstrated by Mia in the series' pilot. In the last season, girls wear denim blue skirts with blue knee boots.

Alternate casual
In later seasons, some girls wear a different ensemble with their white dress-shirts: ochre plaid miniskirts and brown sport jackets, with black Mary Janes and white knee-socks.

Formal
Both girls and boys wear black sport jackets with matching ties, and long-sleeved blue dress-shirts. Boys wear black dress-slacks with matching dress-shoes, while girls wear dressy black miniskirts with matching knee-boots. Girls rarely tie up their formal dress-shirts.

DVDs
{| class="wikitable"
|- bgcolor="#ebfasf5ff"
!align="left"|Information
|-
|align="left"|Rebelde: Primera Temporada (First Season)
Release date
August 2005 
December 2005 
November 21, 2006 

January 9, 2007 
|-
|align="left"|Rebelde: Segunda Temporada (Second Season)
Released
October 29, 2006 
April 10, 2007 
|-
|align="left"|Rebelde: Tercera Temporada (Third Season)Release date
June 30, 2007 
July 10, 2008 
|-
|align="left"|Rebelde: La Serie Completa' (The Complete Series)
Release date
November 13, 2007

|-
|}

RBD
One of the topics that marked the success of the telenovela was the formation of a group named RBD . The production of the telenovela conceived the idea of the musical group to promote both the characters and the telenovela itself. The project quickly surpassed the telenovela in success, so much so that it can now be considered as a separate concept (as Erreway of Rebelde Way did in Argentina). The telenovela was a great promotion for the group since the telenovela gave rise to the great idea of forming the musical group RBD, which is one of the most impressive in the Latin pop genre and has had great success not only in Spanish-speaking countries but also in countries in which Portuguese and English are spoken. The success of Rebelde'' was so great that in the third season, producers decided to lengthen the duration of the episodes to one hour and a half, being the first telenovela with such duration.

Main songs
 "Rebelde" performed by RBD.
 "Solo Quédate en Silencio" performed by RBD.
 "Malas Intenciones" performed by Erik Rubín.
 "Plástico" performed by Natasha.
 "Sálvame" performed by RBD.
 "Nuestro Amor" performed by RBD.
 "Aún Hay Algo" performed by RBD.
 "México, México" performed by Anahí, Dulce María and Maite Perroni.
 "Tras de Mí" performed by RBD.
 "Este Corazón" performed by RBD.
 "No Pares" performed by RBD.

References

External links

 
 

2004 telenovelas
2004 Mexican television series debuts
2006 Mexican television series endings
Boarding school fiction
Comedy telenovelas
Mexican telenovelas
Musical telenovelas
RBD
Televisa telenovelas
Teen telenovelas
Mexican television series based on Argentine television series
Spanish-language telenovelas
Television series about teenagers